Jack Martin Cuzick  (born 11 August 1948) is an American-born British academic, director of the Wolfson Institute of Preventive Medicine in London and head of the Centre for Cancer Prevention. He is the John Snow Professor of Epidemiology at the Wolfson Institute, Queen Mary University of London.

Education and early life
Cuzick was born in Hawthorne, California and attended El Segundo High School. He was awarded a Bachelor of Science degree in Mathematics and Physics in 1970 by the Harvey Mudd College and a Ph.D. in mathematics by Claremont Graduate School in 1974.

Research and career
He worked on the mathematical analysis of clinical trial methodology at Columbia University in New York City in the late 1970s and moved to Oxford University in 1978 to work with cancer epidemiologist Richard Doll. He is involved in the collection and analysis of data for cancer prevention and screening, particularly for breast, cervical and bowel cancers. He is best known for his role conducting the IBIS trials of tamoxifen and aromatase inhibitors for chemoprevention of breast cancer in women with high risk of developing the disease. For this research, Cuzick's team won Cancer Research UK's Translational Cancer Research Prize in 2014,

Honours and awards
 2017 Cancer Research UK Lifetime Achievement in Cancer Research Prize
 2016 Elected Fellow of the Royal Society.
 2015 Cuzick received the American Cancer Society Medal of Honor.
 2014 Cancer Research UK Translational Cancer Research Team Prize
 2003 Elected Fellow of the Academy of Medical Sciences
 Cuzick was appointed Commander of the Order of the British Empire (CBE) in the 2017 New Year Honours for services to cancer prevention and screening.

References

External links
 

1948 births
Living people
People from Hawthorne, California
Cancer epidemiologists
British medical researchers
Academics of Queen Mary University of London
Fellows of the Royal Society
Commanders of the Order of the British Empire
El Segundo High School alumni
Naturalised citizens of the United Kingdom